The Rivington Street station was a local station on the demolished IRT Second Avenue Line in Manhattan, New York City. It had two levels. The lower level had two tracks and two side platforms while the upper level had one track that served the express trains. The next stop to the north was First Street. The next stop to the south was Grand Street. The station closed on June 13, 1942.

References

External links

IRT Second Avenue Line stations
Railway stations in the United States opened in 1880
1880 establishments in New York (state)
Railway stations closed in 1942
Former elevated and subway stations in Manhattan
1942 disestablishments in New York (state)